Crouching Boy is a sculpture of the Renaissance Italian painter and sculptor Michelangelo, preserved today at the Hermitage Museum in Saint Petersburg. It is the only work by Michelangelo in the Hermitage. It was originally intended for the tomb of the Medici family in Florence.

Description 
The Crouching Boy is a 54 cm marble sculpture and shows a boy, naked and turned in on himself, perhaps pulling a thorn from his foot.  Even though the statue is not well finished, facial features, hair and body shapes are easily recognizable.

See also 
 List of works by Michelangelo
Non finito

References

External links 
Crouching Boy page on the Hermitage Museum website

Sculptures by Michelangelo
1530s sculptures
Marble sculptures in Russia
Nude sculptures in Russia
Sculptures of children